Rhenium disulfide is an inorganic compound of rhenium and sulfur with the formula ReS2. It has a layered structure where atoms are strongly bonded within each layer. The layers are held together by weak Van der Waals bonds,  and can be easily peeled off from the bulk material.

Production 
ReS2 is found in nature as the mineral rheniite. It can be synthesized from the reaction between rhenium and sulfur at 1000 °C, or the decomposition of rhenium(VII) sulfide at 1100 °C:

Re + 2 S → ReS2
Re2S7 → 2 ReS2 + 3 S

Nanostructured ReS2 can usually be achieved through mechanical exfoliation, chemical vapor deposition (CVD), and chemical and liquid exfoliations. Larger crystals can be grown with the assistance of liquid carbonate flux at high pressure. It is widely used in electronic and optoelectronic device, energy storage, photocatalytic and electrocatalytic reactions.

Properties 
It is a two-dimensional (2D) group VII transition metal dichalcogenide (TMD). ReS2 was isolated down to monolayers which is only one unit cell in thickness for the first time in 2014. These monolayers have shown layer-independent electrical, optical, and vibrational properties much different from other TMDs.

Structure 
Bulk ReS2 has a layered structure and a platelet-like habit. Different crystal structures were proposed for ReS2 based on single-crystal X-ray diffraction studies. While all authors agree that the lattice is triclinic, the reported cell parameters and atomic arrangements slightly differ. The earliest work describes ReS2 in a triclinic unit cell (sp. gr. P, a = 0.6455 nm, b = 0.6362 nm, c = 0.6401 nm, α = 105.04°, β = 91.60°, γ = 118.97°) as a distorted variant of the CdCl2 prototype (1T structure, trigonal space group Rm). In comparison with ideal octahedral coordination of the metal atoms in CdCl2, the Re atoms in ReS2 are displaced from the centers of the surrounding Se6 octahedra and form Re4 clusters that are linked to chains in the b direction. A later study proposed a more accurate description of the crystal structure. It reports a different triclinic cell (sp. gr. P, a = 0.6352 nm, b = 0.6446 nm, c = 1.2779 nm, α = 91.51°, β = 105.17°, γ = 118.97°) with the doubled c parameter and swapped a and b, α and β. There are two layers in this unit cell, related by symmetry centers, and the chains of clusters run along the a axis. Each layer form parallelogram-shaped connected clusters with Re-Re distances of ca. 0.27-0.28 nm in the cluster, and ca. 0.29 nm between clusters. There is one more structure description of ReS2 published in in yet another triclinic cell (sp. gr. P, a = 0.6417 nm, b = 0.6510 nm, c = 0.6461 nm, α = 121.10°, β = 88.38°, γ = 106.47°) where only one layer is present and the centers of symmetry are in the Re layer. The current consent is that the latter work might have overlooked the doubling of the c parameter captured in.

References 

Rhenium compounds
Sulfides
Transition metal dichalcogenides
Monolayers